Carex trichocarpa, the hairy-fruited sedge, is a species of Carex native to North America. It is listed as a "species of special concern" in Connecticut, United States. The larvae of Euphyes bimacula, the two-spotted skipper, feed on the plant. Euphyes bimacula is listed as endangered in Connecticut.

References

trichocarpa
Flora of North America